Solena may refer to:
 Solena (bivalve), a genus of bivalves in the family Solenidae
 Solena (plant), a genus of plants in the family Cucurbitaceae
 Solena, a genus of plants in the family Rubiaceae, synonym of Posoqueria